The 2022 Polish Athletics Championships was the 98th edition of the national championship in outdoor track and field for athletes in Poland. It was held between 9 and 11 June at the Athletics stadium in Suwałki.

Schedule 
On the first day of the competition, around 5 pm, heavy rain began. Immediately after the opening ceremony, a storm and a thunderstorm caused the competition to be paused and then canceled. The competitions have been moved to next days.

Results

Men

Women

References

External links 
Polish Athletics Association website 

2022
Polish
Athletics